Based in Waterloo, Iowa, the Waterloo White Hawks were a minor league baseball team that existed from 1946 to 1956. They played in the Three-I League and were affiliated with the Chicago White Sox. They played their home games at Riverfront Stadium.

Notable players
Tom Hurd, pitcher
Barry Latman, pitcher
Glen Rosenbaum, pitcher
Marv Rotblatt, pitcher
Red Wilson, catcher

Year-by-year record

References

Baseball teams established in 1946
Defunct minor league baseball teams
1946 establishments in Iowa
1956 disestablishments in Iowa
Baseball teams disestablished in 1956
Defunct baseball teams in Iowa
Chicago White Sox minor league affiliates